The 1970–71 Primeira Divisão was the 37th season of top-tier football in Portugal.

Overview
It was contested by 14 teams, and S.L. Benfica won the championship.

League standings

Results

Season statistics

Top goalscorers

References

External links
 Portugal 1970-71 - RSSSF (Jorge Miguel Teixeira)
 Portuguese League 1970/71 - footballzz.co.uk
 Portugal - Table of Honor - Soccer Library

Primeira Liga seasons
1970–71 in Portuguese football
Portugal